Humayun Kabir Hiru is a Jatiya Samajtantrik Dal-JSD politician and the former Member of Parliament of Barguna-1.

Career
Hiru was elected to parliament from Barguna-1 as a Jatiya Samajtantrik Dal-JSD candidate in 1986.

References

Jatiya Samajtantrik Dal-JSD politicians
Living people
3rd Jatiya Sangsad members
Year of birth missing (living people)